Ernst Gideon Jansz (born May 24, 1948 in Amsterdam) is one of the founding members and frontmen of Doe Maar. Doe Maar is a Dutch 1980s ska/reggae band, and is considered one of the most successful bands in Dutch pop history.

His father, born in Semarang on Java, is an Indo (Dutch-Indonesian), who went to the Netherlands in 1932 after finishing his study at the Batavia HBS to continue his higher education there. Once Nazi Germany invaded the Netherlands his father was involved in the Dutch resistance movement, until he was captured and interned in a German concentration camp. After the war he became one of the few Indo advocates for an independent Indonesia. In his view the principle of liberty and independence applied to both situations: Dutch independence from Nazi Germany and Indonesian independence from the colonial Netherlands.

Much of the literary work of the author Jansz is based on his Indo identity and his fathers' heritage.
   
In 1997 Jansz married actress , the mother of his two youngest children. He has a (step)daughter from a previous marriage. He lives with his family in Neerkant, the Netherlands.

Music
Together with Henny Vrienten, Jansz wrote the majority of the Doe Maar-songs and alternated as lead vocalists. He was originally asked to be the band's keyboardist, and played synthesizer on many songs. His Indo background has influenced much of his work (for Doe Maar), particularly "Rumah Saya" (My House or My Home), which he wrote and recorded in 1980 for Skunk, one of the best-sold albums in Dutch pop history. In the song he describes that he fits in with neither Dutch nor Indonesian culture fully.
No mountains at the horizon, in this land of my birth. [...] And then I long for the land of my father. But also there I will be a stranger. [...] Rumah saya dimana? (Wheres my home?) Song lyrics by Ernst Jansz, 1981.

Doe Maar broke into superstardom in 1982, making both Jansz and Vrienten the perfect pop-idols in their mid-thirties. Overexposure caused them to break up two years later. Ernst Jansz returned to folk band CCC Inc and did other projects as a sideman and a solo-artist. In 1995 he rejoined singer-/songwriter Boudewijn de Groot's backing band.

In 2000 Doe Maar released one last album and continued to play occasional reunion-shows.

Books and albums

Ernst Jansz has written three semi-autobiographical books: Gideons droom (Gideon's Dream, 1983) De Overkant (The Other Side, 1985), and Molenbeekstraat (Een liefdeslied 1948 – 1970) (Molenbeekstraat: a lovesong 1948–1970), 2006).  The latter two share their titles with Jansz' solo-albums. Gideons droom is about a second-generation Indo (Indo-European) Dutchman like himself; De Overkant is a three-part book dealing with letters between Jansz and his family (especially his father), the life of his mother, and an account of his trip to Indonesia.  Molenbeekstraat covers his early life and mixes in songtext from the Molenbeekstraat album.

Discography

Soloalbums 
 1999 – De Overkant
 2006 – Molenbeekstraat

CCC inc. 
 1970 – To Our Grandchildren
 1971 – Watching The Evening Sun
 1973 – Castle in Spain
 1975 – CCC Forever
 1984 – Van Beusekom
 1990 – Speed & Intensity
 2000 – Jan
 2007 – 1967–2007 (Box)

Slumberlandband 
 1975 – Slumberlandband

Doe Maar

Studioalbums
 1979 – Doe Maar
 1981 – Skunk
 1982 – Doris Day & Andere Stukken
 1983 – 4us
 2000 – Klaar

Dub-album
 1982 – Doe de Dub (Dub-version of 'Doris Day')

Live-albums
 1983 – Lijf aan Lijf
 1995 – Het Afscheidsconcert (incl. video)
 2000 – Hees van Ahoy (incl. DVD)

De Gevestigde Orde 
One off project by the Dutch Pop music foundation: Ernst Jansz, Joost Belinfante, Doe Maar members (without Henny Vrienten) and Bram Vermeulen & his band.
 1983 – De Gevestigde Orde (live-lp)

Rienne Va Plus 
Trio: Ernst Jansz, Jan Hendriks and singer Rieany (Rienne) Janssen.
 1990 – Rienne Va Plus
 1992 – Money Makes Millionaires

Producer 
 1984 – Drie Heren – Ik Zag Drie Heren...
 1985 – Blue Murder – La La Love
 1985 – Claw Boys Claw – Indian Wallpaper
 1986 – Blue Murder – Talk Talk Talk
 1986 – Blue Murder – Stalking The Deerpark
 1991 – Bram Vermeulen – Vriend En Vijand
 1994 – Bram Vermeulen – Achter Mijn Ogen
 1995 – Bram Vermeulen – Tijd/Vrije Tijd
 1997 – Bram Vermeulen – Polonaise
 1997 – Boudewijn de Groot – Een hele tour: Gent
 1998 – Bram Vermeulen – Allemaal
 2004 – Boudewijn de Groot – Eiland In De Verte
 2005 – Boudewijn de Groot – Een Avond in Brussel, cd/DVD
 2007 – Boudewijn de Groot – Lage Landen Tour, cd/DVD

Bibliography 
 1983 – Gideons Droom (novel)
 1985 – De Overkant (novel)
 2006 – Molenbeekstraat (novel)

References

External links
 Official website Retrieved May 18, 2010
 Interview with Ernst Jansz Retrieved May 18, 2010
 
 

1948 births
Living people
Dutch musicians
20th-century Dutch novelists
20th-century Dutch male writers
21st-century Dutch novelists
Dutch male novelists
Dutch people of Indonesian descent
Indo people
Musicians from Amsterdam
Dutch people of Indo descent
21st-century Dutch male writers